Chamaita sundanympha is a moth of the family Erebidae. It is found on Borneo and Java. The habitat consists of lowland forests.

The length of the forewings is about 7 mm for males and 7–8 mm for females.

References

Moths described in 2001
Nudariina